The Light is the 1995 debut album by American progressive rock band Spock's Beard. The album features two different covers—one for its domestic release, and one for its European release.
"The Light" has since become Spock's Beard's signature song.
The album has since been remastered and re-released by Radiant Records.

Background and writing
In 1991, Morse left the Los Angeles music club life and moved to Nashville, TN. Morse took a motivational weekend course and realized that "I got into music because I loved it and I wanted to do big pieces." Two weeks later, Morse wrote The Light, Go the Way You Go, and The Water. Morse then invited his brother Alan Morse to play along on the demos. The Morse brothers later met drummer Nick D'Virgilio at a bar open jam night and was invited to join the band along with Dave Meros.

The title track, The Light, also signals the birth of the "Neal Morse epic", a signature of his longform songwriting that remains to this day.

Track listing
All songs written by Neal Morse except where noted.

Critical reception
In 2017, Prog Sphere ranked The Light as the second best album in the Spock's Beard discography behind V.

The title track, The Light, was ranked as the second best Modern Prog Song of the 1990-2015 period by The Prog Report in 2017.

Personnel
Neal Morse - lead vocals, mellotron, hammond organ, all other keyboards, acoustic & electric guitar
Alan Morse - lead electric guitar, cello, mellotron, vocals
Dave Meros - bass, french horn
Nick D'Virgilio - drums, percussion, backing vocals

Additional personnel
Molly Pasutti and Wanda Houston - background vocals on "The Water"

Release details
1995, USA, SynPhonic, CD
1998, USA, Metal Blade ?, Release Date 8 September 1998, CD
2001, USA, Giant Electric Pea GEPCD1017, Release Date 30 July 2001, CD
2004, UK, SPV Records SPV08528200, Release Date 22 March 2004, CD
2004, UK, SPV Records SPV08728208, Release Date 17 May 2004, CD (Cover artwork special edition)

References

Spock's Beard albums
1995 debut albums
Metal Blade Records albums